The Échez is a left tributary of the Adour, in the Hautes-Pyrénées, in the Southwest of France.

Geography 
The Échez rises in Sère-Lanso (east of Lourdes) and flows north along the Adour, which it joins in Maubourguet. It flows through Tarbes and Vic-en-Bigorre.

Main tributaries 
 (R) Aube,
 (L) Jeune,
 (R) Gespe, in Tarbes,
 (L) Souy,
 (L) Géline, from the plateau of Ger
 (L) Lis, from Ger.

References

Rivers of France
Rivers of Hautes-Pyrénées
Rivers of Occitania (administrative region)